Doliognathus is an extinct genus of conodonts in the family Bactrognathidae from the Middle Dinantian (Lower Carboniferous). It is a genus of multielement conodonts.

References

External links 

 

Prioniodinida genera
Taxa named by Maurice Mehl
Mississippian conodonts
Fossil taxa described in 1941